The Pompée-class ships of the line were a class of two 74-gun third rates.

Ships
 
Builder: Pitcher, Northfleet
Ordered: 10 June 1795
Launched: 19 March 1798
Fate: Broken up, 1826

 
Builder: Cleverley, Gravesend
Ordered: 10 June 1795
Launched: 16 April 1798
Fate: Sold out of the service, 1865

References

 
Ship of the line classes